The Caracas–La Guaira highway is a highway that connects Caracas, the capital of Venezuela, to its principal port city of La Guaira, capital of the Vargas state. It was designed as an alternative to the old highway linking Caracas with La Guaira, the Carretera Vieja, a circuitous route with dangerous curves and steep drops. The end-to-end journey on the old highway had taken one hour while the new highway allowed the same trip to be made in 20 minutes.

It is the primary route between Caracas and the coast, and it links Caracas with its main international airport, Simón Bolívar International Airport. It was designed and built during the government of Colonel Marcos Pérez Jiménez and the military junta government that preceded it. Construction began in January 1950, and lasted until late 1953, with a huge cost of 3,500,000 dollars per km at the time, and 60,000,000 dollars on the present.

At the time of its inauguration, the project was considered an engineering masterpiece, and one of the most visible examples of Venezuelan politics to reverse its oil wealth to the land.

Characteristics

By the time construction was completed, the highway was considered by many aspects such as the most important engineering complex done in America after the Panama Canal, through a range of unmatched engineering prowess to that time, a spectacular highway which runs through the picturesque mountains of the north. The construction of the highway began in January 1950 after six years of careful study by the Ministry of Public Works in Venezuela during the military regime by colonel Marcos Pérez Jiménez (1952-1958).

The highway serves as a vital artery linking Caracas with important Maiquetia Airport, whose daily turnover is about 200 domestic and international flights, and the thriving port of La Guaira, where it enters about 50% of all of the country's imports. Also, the highway will impart momentum to the development of coastal property. With only 36 turns, it reduced the travel time by about 15 minutes. The maximum degree of the new road is only 6%, and 3.5% in the tunnels, compared with 12% on the old road.

Caracas, with its unique topographical situation has contributed significantly to its development, is located on the mountains of the coast 17 km south of La Guaira and the Caribbean Sea, on whose level exceeds about 936 metres.

Two thousand workers and over 200 bulldozers, tractors, and trucks worked feverishly to finish the work in time for the Tenth Inter-American Conference of Foreign Ministers, which was to take place in Caracas during the first quarter of 1954. Along with the many Venezuelan workers who worked in the three viaducts were a group of 300 men including immigrant Italians, Germans, Austrians, and Slavs who arrived not long ago to Venezuela (all this by the doctrine of General Pérez Jiménez, who encouraged and supported the immigration to the Venezuelan Nation).

The highway was praised by the international media. The United States's gag reel newscast, Movietone News, dedicated a report on the highway.

Tunnels and viaducts
The two highway tunnels were built at a cost of approximately $20,000,000 for the only other foreign company that participated in the project. The company is the Morrison Knudsen Company Inc. of Boise, Idaho, United States.

Each tunnel is actually a set of twin tubes separated by a natural wall of about 12 metres wide, with two lanes of traffic in one direction on each side. The first Boqueron tunnel measures . The second Boqueron Tunnel measures 

The tunnels were designed by Ralph Smillie, head of a consulting engineering company in the city of New York, according to the strictest safety specifications and the most advanced methods in this type of construction for the time.

The tunnels have a modern ventilation system that automatically regulates the entry of fresh air in proportion to the concentration of carbon monoxide expelled by motor vehicles. A tunnel along the greater length of 1,780 meters, two galleries were built vertical sites about one-third the length of the underpass. These galleries are raised tunnel about 37 m to the surface of the mountain, and are used to inject fresh air and expel combustion gases coming out of cars that travel.

In addition to more efficient lighting that existed at the time, the tunnels have a modern system for regulating traffic in case of occurrence of any emergency, as well as a variety of apparatus for firefighting.

At the north end of the tunnel will be built a smaller building to house the equipment that will control the ventilation and traffic regulation. The tunnel will have more buildings at both ends, which are now installed automatic controls of the twin tunnels.

A house, central control, was built near the side of the tunnel Greater Caracas, where electrical panels were installed specifically designed to regulate the ventilation lighting, traffic, and warning signs of both tunnels. In this building, there is always ready to guard crews clear the highway tunnels and of any accident or interruption that may occur.

Viaducts
One of the viaducts along the route, known as Viaduct #1, was plagued by gradual landslides from the 1980s onward. During the 1967 Caracas earthquake, it suffered severe deformations due to the displacement of the hill and the failure of Gramoven Tacagua. The bases of the supports shifted toward the centre of the span, causing the supports to crack and the span to buckle upward. Venezuelan governments made constant repairs to strengthen the supports and stabilize the span, but did not develop a long-term solution. The government closed the highway as a safety precaution on 5 January 2006. The sudden isolation of Caracas from the coast prompted political accusations by the opposition against Hugo Chávez's government, and by Chávez supporters against previous governments' failure to deal with the problem. A narrow and steep detour around the viaduct opened on February 28, and the viaduct span fell on March 19. Construction began in March 2006 on a replacement viaduct, which opened on 21 June 2007.

References

Roads in Venezuela